Thomas W. Luce, III (Tom Luce) is an American lawyer, government official, non-profit executive, and former advisor to H. Ross Perot. He is CEO of Biotech Initiatives at Lyda Hill Philanthropies.

Early life and education
Thomas W. Luce, III was born in Dallas Texas where he was raised by a single mother. He attended public schools in Highland Park Independent School District.

He received an athletic scholarship to Virginia Military Institute but transferred to Southern Methodist University where he earned a B.B.A. in 1962 and a J.D. from the Dedman School of Law in 1966.

Purchase of the Magna Carta
In 1984, Tom Luce handled negotiations for a purchase of a 700-year-old copy of the Magna Carta by Ross Perot. He brought the document to the United States wrapped in brown shipping paper and stowed in the coat closet across from his seat on a commercial American Airlines flight.

Political Activities

1990 Texas Gubernatorial Race 
Luce ran for Governor of Texas as one of several Republicans looking to succeed outgoing Governor Bill Clements. He placed third in the Republican Primary with 115,835 votes.

H. Ross Perot Presidential Campaign 
A long-time advisor to Perot, Luce was the chairman of his campaign for President of the United States in 1992.

Public Service

George W. Bush Administration 
President Bush nominated Tom Luce to the position of assistant secretary for the Office of Planning, Evaluation and Policy Development at the U.S. Department of Education on May 20, 2005, and the U.S. Senate confirmed his appointment to this position on July 1, 2005.

State of Texas 
Luce was appointed to major posts by Texas governors five times, including as chief justice pro tempore of the Supreme Court of Texas, as well as posts on the Sunset Advisory Commission and the Superconducting Super Collider Commission. In 2012, Speaker of the Texas House of Representatives Joe Straus appointed Luce to the Cancer Prevention and Research Institute of Texas Oversight Committee.

Honors
In 2012, U.S. News & World Report inducted Tom Luce into the U.S. News STEM Leadership Hall of Fame.

Tom Luce was recognized and honored by Republican Congressman Lamar Smith on the floor of the United States House of Representatives in 2012 "for his years of leadership and contributions to improving our public schools, strengthening higher education and supporting business and economic growth," and in 2015 by Democratic Congresswoman Eddie Bernice Johnson for his role in education reform in Texas.

In 2015, Sarah Fullinwider Perot and Ross Perot, Jr. donated $1.75 million to endow the Thomas W. Luce, III Centennial Dedman Law Scholars Program at SMU.

In 2018, he was awarded the 2018 Linz Award, an annual honor recognizing enduring civic or humanitarian efforts benefiting Dallas.

In 2021, Luce was inducted into the Dallas Business Hall of Fame.

References

External links
 White House Biography

1940 births
Highland Park High School (University Park, Texas) alumni
Southern Methodist University alumni
Dedman School of Law alumni
George W. Bush administration personnel
20th-century American politicians
Living people
People from Dallas
Texas Republicans
American lawyers
Lawyers from Dallas